Aswathy Sreekanth is an Indian television actress, television host, writer and YouTuber from Kerala. She is best known for her portrayal of Asha Uthaman in Chakkappazham. She received the Kerala State Television Award for Best Actress in 2020 for Chakkappazham.

Personal life 
On 23 August 2012, Aswathy is married to her long time boyfriend Sreekanth T. S. The couple has a daughter Padma. In March 2021, she announced her second pregnancy. She gave birth to a girl child, Kamala in August 2021.

Career 
Aswathy started her career in 2010 as radio personality at Red FM 93.5 based in Kochi. After her marriage, she moved to Dubai.

Author 
Aswathy began writing her first memoir, Tta yillatha Muttayikal, in 2017. The book is semi-autobiographical and a major part captures her childhood experiences in Thodupuzha.

YouTube 

Aswathy started her YouTube channel in 2021.

Published works

Filmography

As actor

As lyricist

Television

As actor

TV shows

Accolades

References

Notes

External links 
 
 

Living people
1986 births
People from Idukki district
Indian VJs (media personalities)
Indian women television presenters
Indian television presenters
Actresses in Malayalam television
Indian soap opera actresses
Actresses from Kerala
Indian television actresses
Television personalities from Kerala
Malayalam-language writers
Malayalam poets
21st-century Indian actresses
Actresses in Malayalam cinema
21st-century Indian writers
21st-century Indian women writers
Writers from Kerala
Indian radio presenters
Indian radio personalities
Kerala State Television Award winners
Malayalam-language lyricists
Indian YouTubers
Lifestyle YouTubers
YouTube vloggers